The 1919 VFL season was the 23rd season of the Victorian Football League (VFL), the highest level senior Australian rules football competition in Victoria.

For the first time since the peak of World War I, all nine senior clubs competed. The season ran from 3 May until 11 October, and comprised a 16-game home-and-away season followed by a finals series featuring the top four clubs. The league's seconds/reserves competition – known as the Victorian Junior Football League – played its inaugural season.

The premiership was won by the Collingwood Football Club for the fifth time, after it defeated  by 25 points in the 1919 VFL Grand Final.

Premiership season
In 1919, the VFL competition consisted of nine teams of 18 on-the-field players each, with no "reserves", although any of the 18 players who had left the playing field for any reason could later resume their place on the field at any time during the match.

Each team played each other twice in a home-and-away season of 18 rounds (i.e., 16 matches and 2 byes).

Once the 18 round home-and-away season had finished, the 1919 VFL Premiers were determined by the specific format and conventions of the amended "Argus system".

Round 1

|- bgcolor="#CCCCFF"
| Home team
| Home team score
| Away team
| Away team score
| Venue
| Date
|- bgcolor="#FFFFFF"
| 
| 14.14 (98)
| 
| 8.7 (55)
| Princes Park
| 3 May 1919
|- bgcolor="#FFFFFF"
| 
| 12.14 (86)
| 
| 9.4 (58)
| Junction Oval
| 3 May 1919
|- bgcolor="#FFFFFF"
| 
| 12.19 (91)
| 
| 10.11 (71)
| Punt Road Oval
| 3 May 1919
|- bgcolor="#FFFFFF"
| 
| 6.13 (49)
| 
| 9.8 (62)
| Lake Oval
| 3 May 1919

Round 2

|- bgcolor="#CCCCFF"
| Home team
| Home team score
| Away team
| Away team score
| Venue
| Date
|- bgcolor="#FFFFFF"
| 
| 3.10 (28)
| 
| 10.19 (79)
| MCG
| 10 May 1919
|- bgcolor="#FFFFFF"
| 
| 7.9 (51)
| 
| 10.6 (66)
| Corio Oval
| 10 May 1919
|- bgcolor="#FFFFFF"
| 
| 5.15 (45)
| 
| 5.18 (48)
| Victoria Park
| 10 May 1919
|- bgcolor="#FFFFFF"
| 
| 9.11 (65)
| 
| 7.11 (53)
| EMCG
| 10 May 1919

Round 3

|- bgcolor="#CCCCFF"
| Home team
| Home team score
| Away team
| Away team score
| Venue
| Date
|- bgcolor="#FFFFFF"
| 
| 4.7 (31)
| 
| 9.13 (67)
| Junction Oval
| 17 May 1919
|- bgcolor="#FFFFFF"
| 
| 7.7 (49)
| 
| 11.14 (80)
| MCG
| 17 May 1919
|- bgcolor="#FFFFFF"
| 
| 18.10 (118)
| 
| 5.12 (42)
| Brunswick Street Oval
| 17 May 1919
|- bgcolor="#FFFFFF"
| 
| 5.2 (32)
| 
| 5.19 (49)
| Corio Oval
| 17 May 1919

Round 4

|- bgcolor="#CCCCFF"
| Home team
| Home team score
| Away team
| Away team score
| Venue
| Date
|- bgcolor="#FFFFFF"
| 
| 4.9 (33)
| 
| 7.6 (48)
| EMCG
| 24 May 1919
|- bgcolor="#FFFFFF"
| 
| 13.21 (99)
| 
| 3.4 (22)
| Princes Park
| 24 May 1919
|- bgcolor="#FFFFFF"
| 
| 4.15 (39)
| 
| 4.12 (36)
| Lake Oval
| 24 May 1919
|- bgcolor="#FFFFFF"
| 
| 8.6 (54)
| 
| 11.8 (74)
| Punt Road Oval
| 24 May 1919

Round 5

|- bgcolor="#CCCCFF"
| Home team
| Home team score
| Away team
| Away team score
| Venue
| Date
|- bgcolor="#FFFFFF"
| 
| 0.18 (18)
| 
| 6.10 (46)
| Corio Oval
| 31 May 1919
|- bgcolor="#FFFFFF"
| 
| 10.14 (74)
| 
| 7.6 (48)
| Brunswick Street Oval
| 31 May 1919
|- bgcolor="#FFFFFF"
| 
| 7.8 (50)
| 
| 9.16 (70)
| EMCG
| 31 May 1919
|- bgcolor="#FFFFFF"
| 
| 18.15 (123)
| 
| 5.4 (34)
| Princes Park
| 31 May 1919

Round 6

|- bgcolor="#CCCCFF"
| Home team
| Home team score
| Away team
| Away team score
| Venue
| Date
|- bgcolor="#FFFFFF"
| 
| 7.20 (62)
| 
| 11.16 (82)
| Punt Road Oval
| 7 June 1919
|- bgcolor="#FFFFFF"
| 
| 16.20 (116)
| 
| 8.7 (55)
| Victoria Park
| 7 June 1919
|- bgcolor="#FFFFFF"
| 
| 7.18 (60)
| 
| 4.4 (28)
| Brunswick Street Oval
| 9 June 1919
|- bgcolor="#FFFFFF"
| 
| 7.11 (53)
| 
| 11.9 (75)
| Junction Oval
| 9 June 1919

Round 7

|- bgcolor="#CCCCFF"
| Home team
| Home team score
| Away team
| Away team score
| Venue
| Date
|- bgcolor="#FFFFFF"
| 
| 9.16 (70)
| 
| 8.11 (59)
| Princes Park
| 14 June 1919
|- bgcolor="#FFFFFF"
| 
| 5.12 (42)
| 
| 7.9 (51)
| Junction Oval
| 14 June 1919
|- bgcolor="#FFFFFF"
| 
| 6.6 (42)
| 
| 11.12 (78)
| MCG
| 14 June 1919
|- bgcolor="#FFFFFF"
| 
| 6.8 (44)
| 
| 8.8 (56)
| Corio Oval
| 14 June 1919

Round 8

|- bgcolor="#CCCCFF"
| Home team
| Home team score
| Away team
| Away team score
| Venue
| Date
|- bgcolor="#FFFFFF"
| 
| 13.14 (92)
| 
| 7.5 (47)
| Brunswick Street Oval
| 21 June 1919
|- bgcolor="#FFFFFF"
| 
| 7.10 (52)
| 
| 10.12 (72)
| MCG
| 21 June 1919
|- bgcolor="#FFFFFF"
| 
| 6.8 (44)
| 
| 10.10 (70)
| EMCG
| 21 June 1919
|- bgcolor="#FFFFFF"
| 
| 6.13 (49)
| 
| 6.8 (44)
| Lake Oval
| 21 June 1919

Round 9

|- bgcolor="#CCCCFF"
| Home team
| Home team score
| Away team
| Away team score
| Venue
| Date
|- bgcolor="#FFFFFF"
| 
| 16.17 (113)
| 
| 6.8 (44)
| EMCG
| 28 June 1919
|- bgcolor="#FFFFFF"
| 
| 9.14 (68)
| 
| 10.11 (71)
| Victoria Park
| 28 June 1919
|- bgcolor="#FFFFFF"
| 
| 9.15 (69)
| 
| 14.11 (95)
| Princes Park
| 28 June 1919
|- bgcolor="#FFFFFF"
| 
| 5.22 (52)
| 
| 5.4 (34)
| Lake Oval
| 28 June 1919

Round 10

|- bgcolor="#CCCCFF"
| Home team
| Home team score
| Away team
| Away team score
| Venue
| Date
|- bgcolor="#FFFFFF"
| 
| 5.7 (37)
| 
| 6.11 (47)
| MCG
| 12 July 1919
|- bgcolor="#FFFFFF"
| 
| 6.10 (46)
| 
| 6.15 (51)
| EMCG
| 12 July 1919
|- bgcolor="#FFFFFF"
| 
| 8.11 (59)
| 
| 3.18 (36)
| Victoria Park
| 12 July 1919
|- bgcolor="#FFFFFF"
| 
| 5.11 (41)
| 
| 5.9 (39)
| Brunswick Street Oval
| 12 July 1919

Round 11

|- bgcolor="#CCCCFF"
| Home team
| Home team score
| Away team
| Away team score
| Venue
| Date
|- bgcolor="#FFFFFF"
| 
| 7.8 (50)
| 
| 9.11 (65)
| Princes Park
| 19 July 1919
|- bgcolor="#FFFFFF"
| 
| 13.16 (94)
| 
| 2.15 (27)
| Lake Oval
| 19 July 1919
|- bgcolor="#FFFFFF"
| 
| 16.15 (111)
| 
| 7.14 (56)
| Punt Road Oval
| 19 July 1919
|- bgcolor="#FFFFFF"
| 
| 5.9 (39)
| 
| 13.13 (91)
| Junction Oval
| 19 July 1919

Round 12

|- bgcolor="#CCCCFF"
| Home team
| Home team score
| Away team
| Away team score
| Venue
| Date
|- bgcolor="#FFFFFF"
| 
| 9.13 (67)
| 
| 8.8 (56)
| EMCG
| 26 July 1919
|- bgcolor="#FFFFFF"
| 
| 12.11 (83)
| 
| 4.7 (31)
| Victoria Park
| 26 July 1919
|- bgcolor="#FFFFFF"
| 
| 29.15 (189)
| 
| 2.6 (18)
| Lake Oval
| 26 July 1919
|- bgcolor="#FFFFFF"
| 
| 9.18 (72)
| 
| 7.6 (48)
| Punt Road Oval
| 26 July 1919

Round 13

|- bgcolor="#CCCCFF"
| Home team
| Home team score
| Away team
| Away team score
| Venue
| Date
|- bgcolor="#FFFFFF"
| 
| 7.5 (47)
| 
| 14.10 (94)
| Brunswick Street Oval
| 9 August 1919
|- bgcolor="#FFFFFF"
| 
| 11.12 (78)
| 
| 9.11 (65)
| Victoria Park
| 9 August 1919
|- bgcolor="#FFFFFF"
| 
| 6.10 (46)
| 
| 4.10 (34)
| Junction Oval
| 9 August 1919
|- bgcolor="#FFFFFF"
| 
| 8.11 (59)
| 
| 12.22 (94)
| Corio Oval
| 9 August 1919

Round 14

|- bgcolor="#CCCCFF"
| Home team
| Home team score
| Away team
| Away team score
| Venue
| Date
|- bgcolor="#FFFFFF"
| 
| 12.18 (90)
| 
| 10.17 (77)
| Junction Oval
| 16 August 1919
|- bgcolor="#FFFFFF"
| 
| 6.21 (57)
| 
| 3.13 (31)
| Punt Road Oval
| 16 August 1919
|- bgcolor="#FFFFFF"
| 
| 12.15 (87)
| 
| 8.7 (55)
| Lake Oval
| 16 August 1919
|- bgcolor="#FFFFFF"
| 
| 5.6 (36)
| 
| 13.18 (96)
| MCG
| 16 August 1919

Round 15

|- bgcolor="#CCCCFF"
| Home team
| Home team score
| Away team
| Away team score
| Venue
| Date
|- bgcolor="#FFFFFF"
| 
| 10.14 (74)
| 
| 9.4 (58)
| Princes Park
| 23 August 1919
|- bgcolor="#FFFFFF"
| 
| 6.7 (43)
| 
| 4.14 (38)
| Lake Oval
| 23 August 1919
|- bgcolor="#FFFFFF"
| 
| 11.9 (75)
| 
| 11.9 (75)
| Corio Oval
| 23 August 1919
|- bgcolor="#FFFFFF"
| 
| 5.6 (36)
| 
| 20.25 (145)
| MCG
| 23 August 1919

Round 16

|- bgcolor="#CCCCFF"
| Home team
| Home team score
| Away team
| Away team score
| Venue
| Date
|- bgcolor="#FFFFFF"
| 
| 14.16 (100)
| 
| 5.11 (41)
| Punt Road Oval
| 30 August 1919
|- bgcolor="#FFFFFF"
| 
| 21.16 (142)
| 
| 2.5 (17)
| Brunswick Street Oval
| 30 August 1919
|- bgcolor="#FFFFFF"
| 
| 9.18 (72)
| 
| 6.13 (49)
| EMCG
| 30 August 1919
|- bgcolor="#FFFFFF"
| 
| 17.11 (113)
| 
| 5.16 (46)
| Victoria Park
| 30 August 1919

Round 17

|- bgcolor="#CCCCFF"
| Home team
| Home team score
| Away team
| Away team score
| Venue
| Date
|- bgcolor="#FFFFFF"
| 
| 14.12 (96)
| 
| 6.15 (51)
| Corio Oval
| 6 September 1919
|- bgcolor="#FFFFFF"
| 
| 9.13 (67)
| 
| 5.14 (44)
| Victoria Park
| 6 September 1919
|- bgcolor="#FFFFFF"
| 
| 8.11 (59)
| 
| 8.7 (55)
| Princes Park
| 6 September 1919
|- bgcolor="#FFFFFF"
| 
| 3.14 (32)
| 
| 7.10 (52)
| Junction Oval
| 6 September 1919

Round 18

|- bgcolor="#CCCCFF"
| Home team
| Home team score
| Away team
| Away team score
| Venue
| Date
|- bgcolor="#FFFFFF"
| 
| 6.14 (50)
| 
| 3.8 (26)
| Corio Oval
| 13 September 1919
|- bgcolor="#FFFFFF"
| 
| 4.9 (33)
| 
| 10.7 (67)
| MCG
| 13 September 1919
|- bgcolor="#FFFFFF"
| 
| 6.10 (46)
| 
| 9.10 (64)
| Brunswick Street Oval
| 13 September 1919
|- bgcolor="#FFFFFF"
| 
| 5.12 (42)
| 
| 7.19 (61)
| Punt Road Oval
| 13 September 1919

Ladder

Finals

All of the 1919 finals were played at the MCG so the home team in the semi-finals and Preliminary Final is purely the higher ranked team from the ladder but in the Grand Final the home team was the team that won the Preliminary Final.

Semi finals

|- bgcolor="#CCCCFF"
| Home team
| Score
| Away team
| Score
| Venue
| Date
|- bgcolor="#FFFFFF"
| 
| 10.13 (73)
| South Melbourne
| 9.5 (59)
| MCG
| 20 September
|- bgcolor="#FFFFFF"
| 
| 9.10 (64)
| 
| 6.10 (46)
| MCG
| 27 September

Preliminary Final

|- bgcolor="#CCCCFF"
| Home team
| Score
| Away team
| Score
| Venue
| Date
|- bgcolor="#FFFFFF"
| 
| 10.14 (74)
| 
| 6.9 (45)
| MCG
| 4 October

Grand final

Collingwood defeated Richmond 11.12 (78) to 7.11 (53), in front of a crowd of 45,413 people. (For an explanation of scoring see Australian rules football).

Awards
 The 1919 VFL Premiership team was Collingwood.
 The VFL's leading goalkicker was Dick Lee of Collingwood with 56 goals.
 Melbourne took the "wooden spoon" in 1919.
 The Victorian Junior League premiership, which is today recognised as the inaugural VFL reserves premiership, was won by Collingwood's team, Collingwood District. Collingwood District 6.11 (47) defeated University A 4.8 (32) in a challenge Grand Final, played as a curtain-raiser to the senior Grand Final on 11 October at the Melbourne Cricket Ground.

Notable events
 Melbourne returned to the VFL competition, and also changed its constitution so that direct payments (i.e., other than reimbursement of expenses) could be made to players, thus making the team professional, eight years after the VFL had officially done so.
 Since the nine-team competition required one bye each week, the VFL sought expressions of interest from clubs wishing to join the VFL. Whilst there was talk of an Ex-Servicemen's Club and a Public Servants' Club, an application was actually lodged on behalf of a combined Ballarat Football League team, as well as on behalf of the VFA clubs Brunswick, Footscray, Hawthorn, North Melbourne, Port Melbourne, and Prahran.
 The VFL introduced a Second Eighteen competition between its constituent clubs, known as the Victorian Junior Football League.
 At the start of the 1919 season, the VFL had already donated £9,436-0-0 to the Patriotic Fund since the start of the war.
 In its Round 12 match against St Kilda, South Melbourne set the record for highest score in a quarter, kicking 17.4 (106) in the last quarter of the match. This remains the record, and is a full two goals better than any other team has managed, as of 2020. South's record score was helped by St Kilda only having 15 fit players at the start of the quarter, followed up by several Saints players walking off in the course of the last quarter.
 Other records which have since been broken were set in that same match: South Melbourne full-forward Harold Robertson kicked 14 goals in the match (a record until 1929); South Melbourne kicked a match score of 29.15 (189) (a record until 1931), and a winning margin of 171 points (a record until 1979).
 In Round 16, Collingwood defeated Carlton 17.11 (113) to 5.16 (46). No team had scored 100 points against Carlton since Round 1, 1904, a streak of 292 consecutive matches, which remains a VFL/AFL record as of 2017.
 St Kilda's win at Collingwood in Round 2 was its first ever win over Collingwood on the road after a winless streak of 24 matches at Victoria Park (20 in the VFL and four in the VFA).

Footnotes

References
 Rogers, S. & Brown, A., Every Game Ever Played: VFL/AFL Results 1897–1997 (Sixth Edition), Viking Books, (Ringwood), 1998. 
 Ross, J. (ed), 100 Years of Australian Football 1897–1996: The Complete Story of the AFL, All the Big Stories, All the Great Pictures, All the Champions, Every AFL Season Reported, Viking, (Ringwood), 1996.

External links
 1919 Season - AFL Tables

Australian Football League seasons
VFL season